Lucy Bella Simkins ( Earl) is a British teacher of English as a foreign language and the creator of the educational channel 'English with Lucy' on YouTube. She was awarded with the British Council ELTon Award for Innovation in English language teaching in 2017 and with the Entrepreneurial Award by the University of Westminster in 2018.

YouTube career
Lucy Bella Earl studied at the University of Westminster, from which she graduated in 2016 with a BA in Marketing Communications. As part of the Erasmus programme, she studied in Madrid, Spain. Then, in Seville, Lucy qualified to teach English as a foreign language and started working in her new profession.

In 2016, in her final year of university, she launched her educational YouTube channel ‘English with Lucy’. Within its first year of operation, the channel was followed by 100,000 viewers and she decided to focus on turning it into a full-time job and  business.

In 2018, the number of followers exceeded one million and the University of Westminster awarded her Entrepreneurial Award for her online activities. She is an entrepreneur, at times she is called an edutuber, and she deals with various aspects of the English language and culture.

The channel has been featured i.e. in The Times, ITV News, BBC News, as well as in Business Insider and Tages-Anzeiger Panorama.

The content of the channel has been subjected to scholarly analysis, i.e. at a University in Indonesia (2018) and recommended to learners of English.

Apart from her mother tongue, Lucy Bella Earl is fluent in Spanish and has a good command of Italian.

Awards
 2017, the British Council ELTons Awards for Innovation in English language teaching, The Award for Local Innovation in partnership with Cambridge English Language Assessment - Learner or teacher solutions developed at a local, national or regional level to meet a specific local need and within a specific local context.
 2018, Westminster Alumni Awards, Entrepreneurial Award, the University of Westminster, London, UK

References

Further reading
 Building a Massive YouTube Channel with 3.5+ Million subs with Lucy from ‘English with Lucy’

1994 births
English women educators
English-language YouTube channels
Living people
English YouTubers
Educational and science YouTubers